I'll See You in My Dreams is a studio album by Pat Boone, released in 1962 on Dot Records.

Track listing

References 

1962 albums
Pat Boone albums
Dot Records albums